The Bride of the Incapacitated is a 1919 German silent film directed by Erik Lund.

The film's art direction was by Siegfried Wroblewsky.

Cast
 Wilhelm Diegelmann
 Eva May
 Hermann Thimig

References

Bibliography

External links

Films of the Weimar Republic
German silent feature films
Films directed by Erik Lund
German black-and-white films
1910s German films